The 2014–15 Edmonton Oilers season was the 36th season for the National Hockey League (NHL) franchise that was established on June 22, 1979, and 43rd season including their play in the World Hockey Association (WHA).  The 2014–15 season was one of the poorest in franchise history as the Oilers finished behind arizona in the NHL. The team's 62 points was the forth-lowest point total in franchise history (the lowest point total was 60 points obtained back in 1992–93). However, despite the misery endured that season, the Oilers were compensated on April 18, 2015, when they won the 2015 NHL Draft Lottery to pick first overall for the forth time in franchise history
.

Off-season
On April 21, 2014, the Oilers announced that Bill Scott had accepted the position of assistant general manager, replacing Rick Olczyk.

On June 10, 2014, the Oilers hired Craig Ramsay as an assistant coach, replacing Kelly Buchberger. Buchberger will move into a new role in player personnel.

On June 23, 2014, the Oilers announced that Assistant Coach Steve Smith would leave the organization and he would end up being with the Carolina Hurricanes.

Standings

Suspensions/fines

Schedule and results

Pre-season

Regular season

Player statistics
Final stats 
Skaters

Goaltenders

†Denotes player spent time with another team before joining the Oilers. Stats reflect time with the Oilers only.
‡Traded mid-season. Stats reflect time with the Oilers only.
Bold/italics denotes franchise record

Awards and honours

Awards

Milestones

Transactions
Following the end of the Oilers' 2013–14 season, and during the 2014–15 season, this team has been involved in the following transactions:

Trades

Free agents acquired

Free agents lost

Claimed via waivers

Lost via waivers

Lost via retirement

Player signings

Draft picks

The 2014 NHL Entry Draft will be held on June 27–28, 2014, at the Wells Fargo Center in Philadelphia, Pennsylvania. Edmonton finished 28th overall in the league, to secure the 3rd overall pick.

Draft notes
The Edmonton Oilers' second-round pick went to the St. Louis Blues as the result of a trade on July 10, 2013, that sent David Perron to Edmonton in exchange for Magnus Paajarvi and this pick.
The Edmonton Oilers' third-round pick went to the Los Angeles Kings as the result of a trade on January 15, 2014, that sent Ben Scrivens to Edmonton in exchange for this pick.
The Buffalo Sabres' fourth-round pick went to the Edmonton Oilers as the result of a trade on March 4, 2014, that sent Ilya Bryzgalov to Minnesota in exchange for this pick.
The San Jose Sharks' fourth-round pick went to the Edmonton Oilers as the result of a trade on October 21, 2013, that sent Mike Brown to San Jose in exchange for this pick.
The Edmonton Oilers' fourth-round pick went to the Toronto Maple Leafs as the result of a trade on March 4, 2013, that sent Mike Brown to Edmonton in exchange for this pick (being conditional at the time of the trade).
The Ottawa Senators' fifth-round pick went to the Edmonton Oilers as the result of a trade on March 5, 2014, that sent Ales Hemsky to Ottawa in exchange for a third-round pick in 2015 and this pick.
The Edmonton Oilers' fifth-round pick went to the Anaheim Ducks as the result of a trade on March 4, 2014, that sent Viktor Fasth to Edmonton in exchange for a third-round pick in 2015 and this pick.

References

Edmonton Oilers seasons
Edmonton
Edmonton